The 2019 FIBA Africa Basketball League was the 33nd edition of FIBA Africa's premier club Basketball tournament and the 1st under the new format and new name. The season saw an expansion from twelve to sixteen teams.

The season began on February 8, 2019, and ended on May 26, 2019, with the conclusion of the Final Four. The Final Four was hosted at the Kilamba Arena in Luanda, Angola.

It was the last season of the league as the competition was replaced by the Basketball Africa League (BAL), a new competition jointly established by the National Basketball Association (NBA) and FIBA.

Competition format 
FIBA Africa has increased the number of participating teams from twelve to sixteen. These teams get their ticket for the Africa Basketball League through regional qualifiers (Zone 1, 2, 3, 4, 5, 6 and 7 of FIBA Africa).

The qualifiers for the Africa Basketball League Group stage was held from September and until mid-December 2018, while the final phase will take place from January 11 to April 21, 2019, in various African cities.

The 16 teams qualified for the round of 16 will be divided into 4 groups of 4 teams each and the competition will take place in the form of a championship where each team will face respectively the 3 opponents of his group. Then, the first two clubs in each group will qualify for the Elite 8 where the clubs will be divided into four groups of two teams each and then games will be played in a home and away format. At this stage, the competition will be played in a one-way match against the principle of direct elimination. The Four winners will advance to the Final 4, that will be played on April 20 while the final take place the next day.

Qualification tournament

Teams 
A total of 16 teams from 10 countries will contest the league.

Venues and locations
<onlyinclude>

Schedule

Group stage 
The draw was held in Abidjan on 12 January 2019.

The two teams with the best records for each group qualified to Elite 8.

Group A

Group B

Group C

Group D

Knockout phase

Bracket

Elite 8 
The Elite 8 games were played in a home and away basis from March 22, to April 14, 2019.

|}

Final Four
On 19 April 2019, the Kilamba Arena in Luanda, Angola was announced as host of the Final Four. The draw was held on 27 April 2019 in Abidjan.

Semifinals

Third place game

Final

Awards
The individual awards were announced on May 26, after the conclusion of the final.
Most Valuable Player:  Eduardo Mingas (Primeiro de Agosto)
All-Star Team:
 Eduardo Mingas (Primeiro de Agosto)
 Soufiane Kourdou (AS Salé)
 Manny Quezada (Primerio de Agosto)
 Abderrahim Najah (AS Salé)
 James Justice Jr. (Smouha)

Statistics 
Statistics as of the ending of the season.

Individual statistical leaders

Individual game highs

References

External links 
 Official website
 FIBA Africa Official website

FIBA Africa Clubs Champions Cup
2018 in African basketball
2019 in African basketball
2018–19 in basketball leagues